Panetti is an Italian surname. Notable people with the surname include:

Domenico Panetti (1460–1530), Italian Renaissance painter
Ennio Panetti (born 1954), Italian male former long-distance runner
Luciano Panetti (1929–2016), Italian footballer

See also
Panetti v. Quarterman, a United States Supreme Court case

Italian-language surnames